Adapura may refer to places in India:

Adapura, Davanagere, a village in the southern state of Karnataka 
Adapura, Koppal, a village in the southern state of Karnataka